Brachyglottis stewartiae is a species of flowering plant, often referred to as a tree daisy, in the family Asteraceae.  It is found only in New Zealand, especially on its subantarctic islands.  With another tree daisy, Olearia lyallii, it is common in the forest of the Snares Islands, growing to about 6 m in height.  It bears conspicuous clusters of yellow daisy-like flowers.

References
 
 

stewartiae
Flora of New Zealand
Snares Islands / Tini Heke
Plants described in 1881
Endemic flora of New Zealand